Liu Yuhao (born 14 May 1994) is a Chinese footballer who currently plays as a forward for Kunshan.

Club career
Liu Yuhao would move abroad to Portugal where he joined third tier club Mafra before being loaned out to Vila F. Rosário. After playing for Loures, Eléctrico and Tourizense in the third tier, second tier LigaPro side Cova da Piedade took him into the club on 1 February 2017. Although he initially failed to establish himself with the first team due to injury, his contract was renewed with the club in July 2017. After this, on 23 July 2017 he made his debut for the club in the first round of 2017–18 Taça da Liga which Cova da Piedade beat Nacional 3–2. He made his LigaPro debut on 6 August 2017 in a 2–1 home defeat against Santa Clara, coming on as a substitute for Robson in the 77th minute.

On 3 July 2018, Liu was loaned to Lithuanian A Lyga side Stumbras for the rest of the season. He made his debut for Stumbras on the same day in a 2–0 home win against Palanga. On 13 July 2018, Liu played 33 minutes at Stumbras's UEFA Europa League debut in the first qualifying round of 2018–19 UEFA Europa League against Apollon Limassol.

On 29 July 2021, Liu would return to China to join second tier second tier club Kunshan on a free transfer. He would make his debut in a league game on 1 August 2021 against Xinjiang Tianshan Leopard in a 1-0 victory. This would be followed by his first goal for the club in a league game on 16 August 2021 against Suzhou Dongwu in a 4-1 victory. He would go on to establish himself as regular within the team that won the division and promotion to the top tier at the end of the 2022 China League One campaign.

Career statistics

Honours

Club 
Mafra
Campeonato de Portugal: 2014–15

Kunshan
China League One: 2022

References

External links

1994 births
Living people
Chinese footballers
Footballers from Liaoning
C.D. Mafra players
GS Loures players
Eléctrico F.C. players
G.D. Tourizense players
C.D. Cova da Piedade players
Segunda Divisão players
Liga Portugal 2 players
A Lyga players
Chinese expatriate footballers
Expatriate footballers in Portugal
Expatriate footballers in Lithuania
Chinese expatriate sportspeople in Portugal
Chinese expatriate sportspeople in Lithuania
Association football forwards